Bamford is a civil parish in the High Peak district of Derbyshire, England.  The parish contains eight listed buildings that are recorded in the National Heritage List for England.  Of these, one is listed at Grade II*, the middle of the three grades, and the others are at Grade II, the lowest grade.  The parish contains the village of Bamford, and is otherwise rural.  The listed buildings consist of a farmhouse and two associated barns, a bridge, and two churches with associated structures.


Key

Buildings

References

Citations

Sources

 

Lists of listed buildings in Derbyshire